Moritz Karl Ernst von Prittwitz (9 February 1795, Gut Kreisewitz in Alzenau, Lower Silesia –  21 October 1885 in Berlin) is a Royal Prussian Lieutenant-General of Infantry, who supervised the building of the large fortress in Ulm. He was later admitted to the Order of St. John as a Knight of Honor.

See also
 Ernst von Prittwitz und Gaffron as son of Prittwitz

External links

References

1795 births
1885 deaths
People from Brzeg County
People from the Province of Silesia
Lieutenant generals of Prussia